The Scotland women's national rugby union team represents Scotland in women's international rugby union and is governed by the Scottish Rugby Union. The team competes in the annual Women's Six National Championship and has competed in five of the Women's Rugby World Cups since their hosted debut in 1994. The Nation plays an important role in the rugby world stage.

History 
Scotland Women's first official test match was played against Ireland at Raeburn Place in Edinburgh on 14 February 1993, ending in a 10 - 0 win to the hosts. Leading from the front, first Scotland captain Sandra Colamartino was the scorer of both tries.

In April of the following year, Scotland stepped in as alternate host of the 1994 Women's Rugby World Cup, finishing fifth, the team's best appearance to date. Since then, the Women's team have competed in the 1998, 2002 and 2006 and 2010 iterations of the tournament.

The early streak of success peaked on 21 March 1998, as a 8–5 win over England in their final match of the Home Nations Championship marked the achievement of a Grand Slam for Scotland.

The Scottish Women's Rugby Union (SWRU) was the national governing body for women's rugby union in Scotland. It was responsible for the governance of women's rugby union within Scotland. Its role was all-encompassing. It went from youth recruitment, through administrating all senior based (aged 16+) competition, through to the performance and management of the Scotland women's national rugby union team.

At its AGM in June 2009, the SWRU voted unanimously in favour of amalgamating the Scottish Rugby Union and the SWRU to form an integrated national governing body rugby in Scotland.

Thistle and the anthem 
The thistle is the national flower, and also the symbol of the Scotland national rugby union team. According to legend the "guardian thistle" has played its part in the defence of Scotland against a night attack by Norwegian Vikings, one of whom let out a yell of pain when he stepped barefoot on a thistle, alerting the Scottish defenders. The Latin Nemo me impune lacessit ("No-one provokes me with impunity!" in English) is the motto of Scotland's premier chivalric order, the Most Ancient and Most Noble Order of the Thistle.

"Flower of Scotland" has been used since 1990 as Scotland's unofficial national anthem. It was written by Roy Williamson of The Corries in 1967, and adopted by the SRU to replace "God Save the Queen".

Strip 
Scotland have traditionally worn navy blue jerseys, white shorts and blue socks. On the occasion that Scotland is the home side and the opposing team normally wears dark colours, Scotland will use its change strip. Traditionally this is a white jersey with navy blue shorts and socks. During a sponsorship deal, purple was introduced to the traditional blue jersey. This was a significant departure from the traditional colours of blue and white, although purple is inspired from the thistle flower.

Results summary

Overall 

(Full internationals only)
Correct as of 27 November 2016

World Cup

Players

Current squad
Scotland named their final 32-player squad on the 15 September 2022, for the 2021 Rugby World Cup.

Notable internationalists

 Paula Chalmers, Scrum Half, named in World Cup Star XV 
 Donna Kennedy, Number 8, most capped Scottish internationalist
 Jade Konkel, Number 8, first full-time professional Scottish internationalist

See also

Women's international rugby – the most complete listing of women's international results since 1982

References

External links
 

Scotland national rugby union team
European national women's rugby union teams
Women's national rugby union teams
National